Gary Walkow is a filmmaker, photographer, writer and visual artist.

Biography
Gary's earliest dream, from age four, was that he was lying on an operating table with his head split open.  Tangled strands of 8mm film were pouring out of his head.  A doctor picked up a strand of film and held it to the light, it was a scene of little Gary running across the front yard.

Walkow's first film was a film version of Allen Ginsberg's "Howl" which he made at Bellaire High School.  Walkow went to Wesleyan University, where he studied film with Jeanine Basinger.  He did honors thesis research on the films of F.W. Murnau, with George Pratt at the George Eastman House, and in the archives of William K. Everson.

Walkow began his professional career as a film editor, working on industrial films in Houston, Texas.  After a memorable but unsatisfying semester in the MFA Program at USC Film School, Walkow eked by as an editor in the low budget realms of Hollywood.   Working for George Gale (who had edited Jean Renoir's The River), Walkow compiled nature footage bought at bargain basement prices into feature-length films for TV syndication at the rate of one feature a week.  The company specialized in what Gale called "outdoor psychic mysteries."  They were set outdoors because you could shoot without lighting.

Walkow spent an entire year working for Family Films, a company devoted to making Lutheran religious films.  The twelve part "Life of Jesus" needed cleaner dialogue, so all of the dialogue was rerecorded, and Walkow had to cut in the new dialogue.  This process was called looping, as sound loops were made of each line of dialogue and the actor then matched his performance to the loops.  Walkow came to call this "looping for the lord."

His short film, Auto-Mates was about a husband and wife who discover they cannot get out of their automobile, adapt to living inside the car.  It is Exterminating Angel in an Oldsmobile Starfire.  The film shot entirely inside an automobile.  Tom Frei, who shot Gary's Wesleyan films, designed and built a tracking system that allowed for tracking shots inside a moving automobile.  This innovative technique was the subject of an article in the August 1979 issue of "American Cinematographer."

The Trouble With Dick was Walkow's first film as a writer-director.  It tells the story of a struggling science fiction writer, Richard Kendred, who moves in with three women and has a nervous breakdown.  The story of Richard's fictional character, an escapee on a prison planet, is intercut with the narrative in the house.  The Trouble with Dick won the Grand Prize at the Sundance Film festival.  The film was acquired for distribution by FilmDallas Pictures, but the company went bankrupt before it released the film. This began a pattern of jinxed distribution that has haunted Walkow.

Walkow's second film, Notes from Underground, was adapted from the Dostoevsky novella.  Walkow reset the story to contemporary Los Angeles.  Dostoevsky's text was in the form of a first person journal.  Walkow changed this framing device to a confession made to a video camera.  The film stars Henry Czerny, Sheryl Lee, Jon Favreau, and Seth Green.  Robert Frank, who authored the five volume study of Dostoevsky, regarded Walkow's film as the best film adaptation of Dostoevsky.  Frank had been a Professor of French Literature at Princeton when he first read Notes from Underground.  Profoundly moved by the book, Frank changed the course of his life to study Dostoevsky.

Notes from Underground premiered at the Toronto International Film Festival and at Sundance, and won the Innovation Award at the Taos Talking Pictures festival.  The prize was five acres of land on the Taos mesa.

Walkow's third feature, Beat, tells the story of two killings that were pivotal events in the lives of the core Beat writers: Lucien Carr's stabbing of Dave Kammerer in New York City in 1944, and William Burrough's shooting of Joan Vollmer Burroughs in Mexico City in 1951.  The film was shot in Mexico City, Patzcuaro and Paricutin.  It stars Kiefer Sutherland, Courtney Love, Norman Reedus, Ron Livingston, Sam Trammell.  After some controversy at its Sundance Festival premiere (where a certain actress scuffled with a certain film critic's wife), the film was released by Lion's Gate.  Iain Sinclair writes about the film in his book "American Smoke."

Crashing is a meta-sequel to The Trouble With Dick (it tells the story of Richard McMurray, the author of the novel The Trouble with Dick).  Richard's wife locks his out of the house, freezes his assets, and files for divorce.  Richard winds up crashing on the couch of two writing students, and from that borrowed vantage point starts writing about their lives.  The films stars Campbell Scott, Lizzy Caplan, Izabella Miko, Alex Kingston, David Cross, and Stephen Gyllenhaal.

Callers is a Bunuelian comedy.  The plot: Will's fiancé leaves her cell phone behind when she rushes off to work.  She is killed in a car crash, but Will can speak to her on her cell phone.  Soon other dead start calling Will on the cell phone to demand favors.  Walkow lost control of the movie, and new scenes were written, new scenes filmed, and the film re-edited and retitled without Walkow's participation.  Walkow's director's cut of the movie does exist and is discussed by Iain Sinclair in "Sight & Sound" November 2013 issue.  The film stars Nelson Franklin, David Clennon, Katie Holmes, Catherine Hicks, Alex Kingston. 
 
Chasing Flavor is Walkow's first documentary feature.  It follows Maxwell Colonna-Dashwood as he seeks to win the World Barista Championship.  His quest to master coffee leads to Maxwell becoming the world's leading authority on water for coffee.  The experience of making a documentary was a pivotal experience in Walkow's approach to shooting fictional narrative.

Walkow is the author of six novels.  Radio Mary is adapted from his first novel.  Be My Baby is adapted from Walkow's sixth novel.

As a photographer, Walkow has had shows at the William Turner Gallery in Santa Monica.  His Airport Avenue Series was paired with the paintings of Lawrence Ferlinghetti.  The Corner of the Universe series is on permanent display in the upper patio of the Original Farmer's Market in Hollywood.  He is represented by Millinnium Images (London).

Walkow's papers, The Gary Walkow Collection, is preserved at the Margaret Herrick Library of the Academy of Motion Pictures Arts and Sciences.  Walkow's films are preserved at the Academy Film Archive.

Filmography (writer-director)

FEATURE FILMS
Steve Stays to Dinner (2022)
Notes From Underground (2021)
Existential Risk (2017)
Chasing Flavor (2012-2019)
Caffiend (AKA The Trouble with Dot & Harry) (2015)
Radio Mary (2013)
Callers (2009)
Crashing (2007)
Beat (2000)
Notes from Underground (1995)
The Trouble with Dick (1987)

SHORT FILMS
Keep on Truckin' (2022)
The Trick is Existing: Dan Sallitt (2016)
Sleep II (2003)
Mojave Exodus (1985)
The Wedding Dice (1983)
Auto-Mates (1978)
Rite of Passage (1976)
The Continuous Victim (1975)
A Voyeur (1974)
A Futile Attempt to Escape from the Middle Class (filmed 1973, completed 2019)

Novels
Radio Mary
Weekend
The Lone Star of David"
As Bad As It Gets (The Making of "Beat")
The Master Debater
The Laurel Canyon Album
Be My Baby

Photography (series)
My First Truck (36 Years Later)
Corner of the Universe: Fairfax & Third
Airport Avenue Series
23 Short Stories
This White and Silent Room

References
"Beat" by Dan Sallitt, published in 24fps www.panix.com/~sallitt/beat.html
"Dream Science" chapter in "American Smoke" by Iain Sinclair
"Walkow's Way" in "Sight and Sound"  November 2013
"Moving Camera Shots in a Moving Automobile" "American Cinematographer" August 1979

External links
 www.garywalkow.com - Official website
 

Year of birth missing (living people)
Living people
American film directors